HMS Pochahontas was the Virginia letter of marque Pocahontas, launched in 1777. The British Royal Navy captured her in 1780. She participated in the battle of Fort Royal, Martinique, in April 1781. In May she was renamed Pachahunta (or Packahunter). The Navy sold her at Jamaica in 1782.

Capture
Pocahontas was built on the Rappahanock in 1777 and fitted out at Fredericksburg.

Captain Eleazer Callender of the Virginia Navy ship Dragon resigned his commission on 20 July 1779 to take command of Pocahontas. He brought with him John Hamilton, his First lieutenant on Dragon.  At the time, "Virginia's naval vessels were poorly armed, incompetently manned and ill-fitted for service."

The 74-gun ship  captured Pocahontas on 12 September 1780.

Royal Navy service
The Royal Navy purchased Pocahontas on 2 October 1780. On 29–30 April 1781 Pochahontas, Commander Edward Tyrell Smith, was at the inconclusive battle of Fort Royal. On 1 May, as Rear Admiral Samuel Hood and his squadron sailed from Martinique, the French followed. HMS Torbay and Pocahontas were lagging and within range of the enemy guns. The French directed their fire at Torbay which sustained damage to her masts and rigging. Hood sent  to tow Pocahontas out of range. The French then broke off their pursuit. Hood transferred Smith to command , Captain Nott having been killed in the battle, and placed John Davall Burr in command of Pocahontas.

Burr commissioned her and on 28 May she was renamed Pacahunta. Admiral Rodney did not confirm Burr's appointment and Burr transferred to the sloop .

Commander Alexander Inglis Cochrane replaced Burr.

In December Commander Isaac Coffin, of HMS Avenger exchanged ships with Cochrane and took command of Pacahunter in New York. He then sailed her to Barbados, where her arrived in January 1782. Coffin participated in the battle of St Kitts (25-26 January) and then returned to Pochahontas.

Some accounts placed Coffin in Barfleur at the battle of the Saintes, but it is not possible to confirm that.

Coffin and the crew of Pacahunta helped in fighting a great fire in St. John's. His service earned him the thanks of the House of Assembly.

After HMS Santa Mónica wrecked on Tortola on 1 April, Pacahunta helped convey part of her crew to Jamaica. At Jamaica Coffin was appointed to command of the 74-gun . He was confirmed in the rank of captain on 13 June.

Fate
Commander David Gould succeeded Coffin in command of Pachahunta. The Navy sold her at Jamaica on 26 July 1782.

Notes, citations, and references
Notes

Citations

References
Amory, Thomas Coffin (1886) The Life of Admiral Sir Isaac Coffin: Baronet, His English and American Ancestors. (Upham: Cupples).

Middleton, Charles, ed. (1907) Letters and Papers of Charles, Lord Barham: Admiral of the Red Squadron, 1758-1813, Volume 1. Publications of the Navy Records Society, Vol. 32. (George Allen & Unwin).
 
 

1777 ships
Ships built in Virginia
Captured ships
Sloops of the Royal Navy
American Revolutionary War ships of the United States
Privateer ships